Paula S. Hicks-Hudson (born May 28, 1951) is an American politician currently serving as a member of the Ohio House of Representatives. She is the former Mayor of Toledo, Ohio.

Early life and education 
Hicks-Hudson was born in Hamilton, Ohio. She earned a Bachelor of Arts from Spelman College, Master of Arts from Colorado State University, and Juris Doctor from the University of Iowa College of Law.

Career 
She was admitted in the Ohio State Bar Association in 1982 and specialized in business and education Law, as well as Social Security and Working Disability before entering public office.

Hicks-Hudson was appointed to the Toledo City Council in 2011, representing the 4th district, after Michael Ashford vacated the seat when he was elected to the Ohio General Assembly. She ran in the special election in May 2011, and again in the general election in November 2011, winning both to retain her seat. In 2013, her council colleagues voted for her to replace council President Joe McNamara when he resigned to run for mayor.

While serving as Toledo city council president, she was sworn in as acting mayor after her predecessor Mike Collins suffered from cardiac arrest. She served in this office for several days until Collins died, at which point she ascended to the office of mayor. Hicks-Hudson becomes only the second woman to lead the city of Toledo. She also becomes the first African American woman to serve as mayor. Toledo held a special election in November 2015 to fill the seat for the rest of the term. On March 18, 2015 Hicks-Hudson announced her candidacy for the November 2015 mayoral election.

Hicks-Hudson won election to a full term on November 3, 2015. However, she later lost her bid for re-election on November 7, 2017 to fellow Democrat and Lucas County Treasurer Wade Kapszukiewicz.

Electoral history

2011

2015

References

1951 births
Living people
21st-century American politicians
21st-century American women politicians
African-American mayors in Ohio
Ohio city council members
Colorado State University alumni
Mayors of Toledo, Ohio
Democratic Party members of the Ohio House of Representatives
Ohio lawyers
Spelman College alumni
University of Iowa College of Law alumni
Women mayors of places in Ohio
African-American women mayors